TJ Maxx (stylized as T•J•maxx) is an American department store chain, selling at prices generally lower than other major similar stores. It has more than 1,000 stores in the United States, making it one of the largest clothing retailers in the country. TJ Maxx is the flagship chain of the TJX Companies. It sells men's, women's and children's apparel and shoes, toys, bath and beauty, accessories, and home products ranging from furniture to kitchen utensils.

TJ Maxx and Marshalls operate as sister stores, and share a similar footprint throughout the country. While their prices are nearly identical and they have similar store layouts, Marshalls has a more upscale appearance than TJ Maxx and typically sells a larger range of fine jewelry and accessories. Some higher-volume stores have a high-end designer department called The Runway.

The CEO of TJX Companies is Ernie Herrman.

History

TJ Maxx was founded in 1976 in Framingham, Massachusetts, by Bernard Cammarata and the Zayre chain of discount department stores. Zayre had tried but failed to purchase Marshalls, so Zayre hired Cammarata, who had been Marshalls' head of merchandising, to create a rival chain. The concept proved so successful that Zayre sold its namesake chain to Ames, a rival discount department store, in September 1988. In December, Zayre announced a restructuring plan for the company and was renamed as "TJX Companies, Incorporated". TJX bought Marshalls in 1995.

In the fall of 1998, TJ Maxx opened the store chain AJ Wright. This chain was closed in January 2007.

In March 2009, TJX launched an e-commerce site.  At first only selling handbags, the range of items was later expanded to include clothing, shoes, jewelry, other accessories, and some home goods.

Outside of North America, TJ Maxx is known as TK Maxx. The name was modified to avoid confusion with the British retail chain T. J. Hughes. The European headquarters are based in Watford, Hertfordshire.

Comparison with competitors

Business Insider described TJ Maxx as "Macy's worst nightmare" in an oft-quoted 2016 article by Mallory Schlossberg. In a later article Schlossberg also reported on how TJ Maxx's soaring sales "should be concerning for ailing department stores that are fighting to get people to pay full price." As off-price retailers became an increasing threat to traditional department stores, signaling a change in consumer buying habits, TJ Maxx's revenue grew to surpass that of Macy's.

According to The Economist, "the overheads at TJX and Ross are, as a percentage of sales, about half those of Macy's or Nordstrom". Fortune stated that "the quicker inventory turn[s] and the sense that an item on a rack might not be there the following week at a TJ Maxx or a Marshalls has led to a boom in this area of retail and made such stores a rarity in the business: shoppers are coming to stores."

Data theft

In 2007, the company disclosed a computer security breach dating back to 2005: computer hackers had gained access to information on credit and debit card accounts for transactions since January 2003. This exposed more than 100 million customers to potential theft from their accounts. According to the company, this affected customers who used their card between January 2003 and June 2004 at any branch of TJ Maxx. Details were stolen by hackers installing software via Wi-Fi in June 2005 that allowed them to access personal information on customers. The breach continued until January 2007.

Affected TJX stores included TJ Maxx, Marshalls, Winners, HomeSense, A.J. Wright, KMaxx, Bob's Stores in the United States, Winners and HomeGoods stores in Canada, and possibly TK Maxx stores in the UK and Ireland.

Eleven people from around the world were charged with the breach in 2008. In 2007, outside security provider Protegrity estimated that TJ Maxx's losses as a result of the data breach might reach £800 million in the following years, as a result of paying for credit checks and administrative costs for managing the fallout from the breach.

The TJ Maxx Corporation was sued by the Massachusetts Bankers Association and co-plaintiffs including Maine and Connecticut Associated Banks for the data theft. In March 2010, computer hacker Albert Gonzalez was sentenced to 20 years in federal prison after confessing to stealing credit and debit card details from a number of companies, including TJ Maxx.

Notes

References

External links
 TJ Maxx official website
 

1976 establishments in Massachusetts
1987 mergers and acquisitions
Companies that filed for Chapter 11 bankruptcy in 1988
Companies that filed for Chapter 11 bankruptcy in 1990
Arts and crafts retailers
Clothing retailers of the United States
Companies based in Framingham, Massachusetts
Discount stores of the United States
Retail companies established in 1976
TJX Companies